Chintoo is a 2012 Marathi movie in India directed by Shrirang Godbole. Originally based on the popular Marathi comic strip of the same name by Charuhas Pandit, it is the story of a boy named Chintoo and his gang. It was produced by Indian Magic Eye Motion Pictures Pvt. Ltd and on 18 May 2012, the film opened to positive critical and commercial response and was widely appreciated by younger audiences. The film was directed by Shrirang Godbole. Shubhankar Atre plays the lead character of Chintoo. Subodh Bhave, Vibhawari Deshpande, and others played the supporting characters.

Plot
Chintoo, a sweet and naughty boy, lives in an upper middle class, lively neighborhood with his parents. This eight-year-old is extremely popular in his group. Pappu is his best friend and Mini, Raju, Baglya, Neha and the toddler Sonu all together are deemed the unbeatable 'Wanarwede Warriors'.

Chintoo and his gang have big plans for their much awaited summer vacation. They decide to beat their rivals the Vinchoo Biters by making Wanarwede Warriors a stronger cricket team, even strong enough to win The World Cup. They practice hard and also convert the barren piece of land in the society into their very own 'Wanarwede stadium.' The match starts as planned.

Guru, a rogue, forcibly enters that space on the same day and sets up a small Chinese eatery. Akki, a watchman and Sakharam's son, is supposed to run it. The children protest against this intrusion but no one cares. The adults are in fact happy to get an easy access to the Chinese food. No one except Colonel Kaka objects to this illegal entrant and his illegitimate business in the housing complex.

The children try to find space to play cricket but always end up being scolded by adults. They try all means and ways to get their stadium back and also make the adults understand their problem. All their attempts fail until the mastermind Chintoo comes up with his own idea of making a Chinese dragon. Guru worships the dragon and Chintoo believes he will get scared and leave the ground. The Wanarwede Warriors are later joined by the Vinchoo Biters because neither of the teams have ground on which to play. In the end, Chintoo and his friends earn back their ground after their parents realise how important the ground is to them.

Cast
 Chintoo – Shubhankar Atre
 Mini – Suhani Deshpande
 Baglya – Animesh Padhye
 Raju – Ved Ravade
 Pappu – Nishant Bhavsar
 Neha – Rumani Khare
 Sonu – Arjun Jog
 Chintoo's Aai – Vibhavari Deshpande
 Chintoo's Baba – Subodh Bhave
 Chintoo's Ajoba – Shriram Pendse
 Colonel Kaka – Satish Alekar
 Joshi Kaka – Dilip Prabhavalkar
 Joshi Kaku – Bharti Achrekar
 Sakharam Watchman – Vijay Nikam
 Satish Dada – Alok Rajwade
 Guru Dada – Nagesh Bhosale
 Akki – Om Bhutkar
 Art Teacher – Vijay Patwardhan
 Guruji – Prashant Tapasvi
 Chimanee – Mrinmayee Godbole
 Popat – Pankaj Gangan
 Chimanee's Father – Sanjay Lonkar
 Chimanee's Mother – Pournima Ganu Manohar
 Popat's Mother – Sadhana Sarpotdar
 Mini's Aai – Mridul Patwardhan
 Mini's Baba – Sunil Abhyankar
 Raju's Aai – Snehal Tarde
 Raju's Baba – Suraj Satav
 Neha's Aai – Soniya Khare
 Neha's Baba – Ajay Apte
 Pappu's Aai – Chitra Khare
 Pappu's Baba – Amit Patwardhan

Cast and crew
Director – Shrirang Godbole
The story, screenplay, and dialogue – Shrirang Godbole, Vibhawari Deshpande
Director of Photography – Sanjay Jadhav
Lyrics – Sandeep Khare
Music – Dr. Saleel Kulkarni
Editor – Abhijeet Balaji Deshpande
Art Director – Siddharth Tatooskar, Bhakti Tatooskar
Costumes and Makeup – Geeta Godbole
Visual Effects (VFx) – Golden Square Media Works Pvt. Ltd.
Producer – Abhay Gadgil, Shrirang Godbole, Amit Patwardhan, Hrishi Deshpande, Chintamani Vartak, Rajesh Deshmukh
"Chintoo" Cartoon-strip Creators – Charuhas Pandit, Prabhakar Wadekar

The film is the first Indian feature to be adapted from a daily comic strip.

Sequel
A sequel to the first film was announced on 11 March 2013, titled "Chintoo 2 – Khajinyachi Chittarkatha". The film was released across Maharashtra on 18 April 2013. The film had all the children characters played by the same actors as in the first film.

References

External links
IMDB
Film Website
Chintoo website by Pan Ads, Pune
Sakal Newspaper (online edition)
Producers of Chintoo feature film
Loksatta Newspaper (online edition)

2010s Marathi-language films
Films based on Indian comics
Indian children's films